Vagococcus acidifermentans is a  Gram-positive, coccus-shaped, non-spore-forming, facultatively species of anaerobic bacteria. The type strain is AC-1(T) (= KCTC 13418(T) = LMG 24798(T)).

References

External links
LPSN
Type strain of Vagococcus acidifermentans at BacDive -  the Bacterial Diversity Metadatabase

Lactobacillales
Bacteria described in 2011